The neural efficiency hypothesis is the phenomenon where smarter individuals show lower (more efficient) brain activation than less bright individuals on cognitive tests of low to moderate difficulty. For tasks of higher difficulty, however, smarter individuals show higher brain activation.

References

Intelligence
Cognitive tests
Biological hypotheses